Cincia is a monotypic moth genus in the subfamily Arctiinae. Its only species, Cincia conspersa, is found on Jamaica. Both the genus and species were first described by Francis Walker in 1854.

Former species
 Cincia pallida, now Amplicincia pallida (Butler, 1878)

References

External links

Lithosiini
Monotypic moth genera